Calicalicus is a genus of bird in the family Vangidae. It contains two species, both of which are endemic to Madagascar:

Species

The genus was introduced by the French naturalist Charles Lucien Bonaparte in 1854 with the red-tailed vanga as the type species. The name Calicalicus is from the Malagasy word Cali-cali reported by the French zoologist Mathurin Jacques Brisson for the male red-tailed vanga.

References

 
Bird genera
 
Taxa named by Charles Lucien Bonaparte
Taxonomy articles created by Polbot